Aoujeft is one of the four departments (officially called moughataas)  of the wider Adrar Region (the larger administrative division being called a wilaya),  in western Mauritania.  The capital lies at Aoujeft. 

It is made up of four communes, the Agricultural Urban Commune of Aoujeft and the three rural communes of El Medah, Maaden with Terjit and N'Terguent. The total area is 24,556 km²  and the population in the 2013 census was 12997, which had fallen from 20,181 in the 2000 census, a decline equivalent to 3.49% per year.

References

Departments of Mauritania
Adrar Region